Lebuhraya Alor Gajah–Melaka Tengah–Jasin (Alor Gajah–Central Malacca–Jasin Highway), or popularly known as Lebuh AMJ (Alor Gajah–Central Malacca (Malacca)–Jasin), Federal Routes 19 (Malaccan side) and 5 (Johorean side) is a divided highway across Malacca state, Malaysia.

Route background

Generally, the Lebuh AMJ runs north–south from Simpang Ampat to Malacca City before running from west–east from Malacca City to Muar. The entire Malaccan section of the Lebuh AMJ is signed as Federal Route 19, while the Johorean section of the highway is signed as Federal Route 5. The route numbers overlap along the section between Sungai Duyong Intersection to Semabok Interchange. Meanwhile, the section between Malim and Semabok was signed as Federal Route 191 but was decommissioned in 2012 when the entire Lebuh AMJ was gazetted as FT19.

The Kilometre Zero of the Federal Route 19 used to be located at Jalan Hang Tuah-Jalan Kubu intersection in Malacca City. After the Lebuh AMJ was gazetted as the Federal Route 19 in 2012, the Kilometre Zero was moved to Jalan Lama Kesang Intersection at Kesang, Johor.

History
Lebuh AMJ was constructed due to the traffic congestion along the former Federal Routes 19 (Malacca–Simpang Ampat) and 5 (Malacca–Muar). The Simpang Ampat–Malim section of the highway was constructed as an upgrade of the existing Federal Route 19 route, while the Sungai Duyong–Kesang section of the highway was built as an entirely new route. The project was started from 2001 and was completed in 2007 with the total cost of RM505 million. Three interchanges were built along the highway, namely Semabok Interchange, Al Azim Interchange and Malim Jaya Interchange. The entire Lebuh AMJ was opened to traffic on 29 June 2007.

The Lebuh AMJ is notorious for having many unattended cows being left roaming along the Sungai Duyong–Kesang section, posing risks of accidents to motorists. To reduce accidents caused by the unattended cows, the state government of Malacca proposed safety measures such as street lights, high-mast lighting and fences to be installed along the section, which would cost RM5 million.

Features
There are five Rest and Service Area (RSA) along Lebuh AMJ: two at Sungai Rambai, one at Paya Rumput, one at Rembia and one at Melekek.

At most sections, the Lebuh AMJ was built under the JKR R5 road standard as a dual-carriageway highway with partial access control, allowing maximum speed limit of up to 90 km/h. This highway also features fast lane-to-slow lane U-turns.

Overlaps: Semabok–Duyong, Kesang–Muar (overlaps with route 5)

There are no alternate routes or sections with motorcycle lanes.

List of interchanges and intersections

References

2007 establishments in Malaysia
 
Highways in Malaysia
Malaysian Federal Roads